Vincent Vanasch (born 21 December 1987) is a Belgian field hockey player who plays as a goalkeeper for German club Rot-Weiss Köln and the Belgium national team.

Club career
Vanasch has been involved in hockey from an early age; his father "Jean" created the youth school of the "Royal Evere White Star Hockey Club". He did all his classes until the first team with which he won several titles (grass and indoor). When the club got relegated to Division 1, at the end of the 20062007 season, he went to play at the "Royal Penguin Hockey Club Nivellois". He played for two seasons before getting a transfer to KHC Leuven. From the 20102011 season onwards, he started playing for the Waterloo Ducks. In 2014, he made a transfer to the Netherlands to Oranje Zwart. He played there until 2016, when he returned to the Waterloo Ducks.

In the 2018–19 Euro Hockey League, Vanasch's Waterloo Ducks became the first Belgian club to win the Euro Hockey League. In January 2020, it was announced he would play for Rot-Weiss Köln in Germany from the 2020–21 season onwards.

International career
At the 2012 Summer Olympics, Vanasch competed for the national team in the men's tournament. Vanasch won the silver medal with Belgium at the 2013 European Championship on home ground in Boom.  At the 2016 Summer Olympics, he was part of the Belgian team who won the silver medal.

In 2017, Vanasch was named the FIH Goalkeeper of the Year. At the 2018 Hockey Stars Awards he was named the FIH Goalkeeper of the Year for the second time in a row. At the 2019 EuroHockey Championship, where Belgium won its first European title, he was named the goalkeeper of the tournament. In December 2019, he again was nominated for the FIH Goalkeeper of the Year Award. On 11 February 2020, he was awarded his third FIH Goalkeeper of the Year Award. On 25 May 2021, he was selected in the squad for the 2021 EuroHockey Championship.

References

External links

1987 births
Living people
People from Evere
Belgian male field hockey players
Male field hockey goalkeepers
Field hockey players at the 2012 Summer Olympics
2014 Men's Hockey World Cup players
Field hockey players at the 2016 Summer Olympics
Field hockey players at the 2020 Summer Olympics
2018 Men's Hockey World Cup players
Olympic field hockey players of Belgium
Olympic silver medalists for Belgium
Olympic medalists in field hockey
Medalists at the 2016 Summer Olympics
Oranje Zwart players
Waterloo Ducks H.C. players
Men's Hoofdklasse Hockey players
Expatriate field hockey players
Belgian expatriate sportspeople in the Netherlands
Belgian expatriate sportspeople in Germany
Men's Belgian Hockey League players
KHC Leuven players
Rot-Weiss Köln players
Olympic gold medalists for Belgium
Medalists at the 2020 Summer Olympics
Field hockey players from Brussels
2023 Men's FIH Hockey World Cup players